Dinara can refer to:

People

Dinara Alimbekava, Belarusian biathlete
Dinara Aliyeva, Azerbaijani soprano
Dinara Asanova, Soviet film director
Dinara Drukarova, Russian actress
Dinara Gimatova, Azerbaijani gymnast
Dinara Nazarbayeva, Kazakhstani businesswoman, daughter of Nursultan Nazarbayev
Dinara Sadretdinova, Russian actress and TV presenter
Dinara Saduakassova, Kazakhstani chess player
Dinara Safina, Russian tennis player
Dinara Wagner, German chess player

Geography

Balcans, Europe 
 Dinara Mountain (Sinjal), highest mountain in Croatia
 Dinara Mountain Range, along the Bosnian-Croatian border
 Dinaric Alps (Dinarides), major mountain region of Europe

India 
 Dinara, Bihar, a village in Bihar, India
 Dinara, Kutch,a village near Bhuj of Kutch district of Gujarat, India.

Other
 The Tale of Tsaritsa Dinara, a Russian folktale
 Dinaria (harvestman), a genus of harvestman
 Dinarius